The Standard Barrel Act For Fruits, Vegetables, and Dry Commodities is United States legislation that specified the standard barrel size and measurements for fruits and vegetables, establishing grading standards and inspections for each produce type.  It penalized merchants who didn't use standardized barrels.  The act was sponsored by Rep. William E. Tuttle, Jr. (D) of New Jersey.

Associated Statute of 1915 Act
United States Congressional bill relative to United States law in accordance with the Standard Barrel Act For Fruits, Vegetables, and Dry Commodities.

See also
 Farmers' Bulletin
 Standard Fruits and Vegetable Baskets and Containers Act of 1916

External links
 Text of the act
 

1915 in American law
63rd United States Congress
United States federal commerce legislation